Down on Me may refer to:

 "Down on Me" (traditional song), a traditional song from the 1920s that became popular following its remake by Big Brother and the Holding Company

 "Down on Me", a 1980 song by Heart from their album Bébé le Strange, which was re-recorded for their 2016 album Beautiful Broken
 "Down on Me", a 1990 song by Gigolo Aunts from Tales from the Vinegar Side
 "Down on Me", a 1992 song by Jackyl from their eponymous debut album
 "Down on Me" (Jeremih song), 2010
 "Down on Me", a 2014 song by DJ Mustard
 "Down on Me", a 2016 song by Fedde Le Grand